Reverend James Moore Sr. (February 1, 1956 – June 7, 2000), born James Leslie Moore, was an American gospel artist. He died in 2000, aged 44.

Career 
In his earlier days, Moore received much of his tutelage and artistic craft by gospel music legends and personal friends such as the late Dr. Mattie Moss Clark, Rev. James Cleveland, and Richard "Mr. Clean" White, among many others. He also gave much acclaim to the Gospel Music Workshop of America (GMWA) for the molding of his gospel music career .

After many chart-topping gospel hits and much noted success in the 1980s and early '90s, Moore soon became a household name among many gospel music listeners. In the mid-'90s Moore was diagnosed with colon cancer, and his health began to suffer. After recording a new album in May 1994, he was diagnosed with diabetes, which left him bound to a wheelchair, blind and placed on dialysis. Determined to disallow any disease from hindering him to sing and minister, Moore continued singing, ministering, and recording. Moore's last recordings, "It Ain't Over (Til God Says It's Over)" which was recorded on his forty-first birthday in 1997 in Pittsburgh, Pennsylvania, and another album entitled Family and Friends, Live in Detroit, was recorded in the summer of 1999 in his hometown of Detroit, with some of his dearest industry friends and gospel notables, such as Vanessa Bell Armstrong, Rudolph Stanfield, and Darius Twyman. The album was released in early 2000, shortly before his death at the age of 44. He leaves 2 children, a daughter named  Tamara Moore & a son named Armel Moore.

Awards
Rev. Moore has also won several awards and accolades, which include a Stellar Award for Best Male Solo Performance, three Grammy Nominations, Dove Award Recipient, and several awards from the GMWA.

References

External links
 
 James Moore memorial

1956 births
2000 deaths
Deaths from diabetes
American gospel singers
Singers from Detroit
American Pentecostals
Members of the Church of God in Christ
Church of God in Christ pastors
20th-century African-American male singers